Georgios Samartzis (Greek: Γεώργιος Σαμαρτζής; 8 February 1868, Corfu - 19 March 1925, Athens) was a Greek painter and musician; associated with the Heptanese School.

Biography
His grandfather was the noted historian and memoirist, Panagiotis Samartzis (1797-1871). He took his first painting lessons at a private school operated by Charalambos Pachis. He would later marry one of Pachis' daughters.

In 1888, thanks to a scholarship from the Petrides Endowment, he was able to study at the Accademia di Belle Arti di Napoli, with Professors Domenico Morelli and Vincenzo Marinelli. After returning to Greece, he taught at the Technical High School then, in 1902, took over management of the new Corfu Art School, founded by Angelos Giallinas. In addition to painting, he also dabbled in poetry and was an accomplished musician. 

He dealt with a variety of themes, including portraits, landscapes, ethnographic scenes, and religious art; including a large "Last Supper". His works are generally classified as Academic Realism.

During World War I he moved to Athens, where he died. His works may be seen at the National Gallery and the University of Athens. The  has a special display room devoted to his paintings and those he collected. A street has been named after him.

References

Further reading
 Giorgos Karter: Ο ζωγράφος Γεώργιος Σαμαρτζής (The Painter, Georgios Samartzis), Lotus Press, 1997
 Ζωγραφίζοντας στην Κέρκυρα (Painting in Corfu), National Gallery of Greece, Corfu branch, 2003 pg.76 
 Tonis Spiteris, 3 αιώνες νεοελληνικής τέχνης (Three Centuries of Greek Art), Papyros, 1979  

External links

 More works by Samartzis @ Trattato della Pittura

1868 births
1925 deaths
Greek painters
Greek portrait painters
Accademia di Belle Arti di Napoli alumni
Artists from Corfu